Gordonville is a small unincorporated community in Grayson County, Texas, United States.  The community is named for Missouri bushwhacker Silas M. Gordon who operated a store there. It is also a part of the Sherman–Denison Metropolitan Statistical Area.

References

External links
Handbook of Texas profile

Unincorporated communities in Texas
Unincorporated communities in Grayson County, Texas